Laurelhurst is a residential neighborhood in Seattle, Washington, USA. It is bounded on the northeast by Ivanhoe Place N.E., beyond which is Windermere; on the northwest by Sand Point Way N.E. and N.E. 45th Street, beyond which are Hawthorne Hills, Ravenna, and University Village; on the west by Mary Gates Memorial Drive N.E., beyond which is the East Campus of the University of Washington; on the southwest by Union Bay; and on the east by Lake Washington. Seattle Children's Hospital is located in its northwest corner. Once a seasonal campground of the Duwamish people, the neighborhood has been a part of Seattle since its annexation in 1910.

The community center is an official city landmark. The Laurelhurst Beach Club, Laurelhurst Park, and its Laurelhurst Community Center serve as gathering places.

Laurelhurst has had several famous residents, including Melanie Griffith and Antonio Banderas, who rented a house on the waterfront one summer while filming a movie; musician Duff McKagan, bassist for Guns N' Roses. Bill Gates lived as a young child in Wallingford before moving to the neighborhood, where his father Bill Gates Sr. lived.

The neighborhood is one of the most expensive in Seattle, with median home prices around $1,649,000, over double the overall Seattle median of $735,000, .

History
The name Laurelhurst dates from between 1906 and 1909, when Joseph McLaughlin and R.F. Booth, incorporated under the name McLaughlin Realty Company, acquired property from several owners in the already established areas of Scottish Heights and Yesler Village. They established a new plat, introduced the new name, brought in water, electricity, and sewer services, but failed to attract a streetcar line.

"Laurel" stands for the plant name Laurel and "hurst" means "wood" in archaic English.

Education
Laurelhurst is home to Laurelhurst Elementary School, Villa Academy, an independent grade school, the Wu Hsing Tao School, and the Seattle Midwifery School.

News sources
The community was served by the North Seattle Herald-Outlook, which printed a weekly edition until it was shut downin January 2012by owner Pacific Publishing Company.

Notes

External links

HistoryLink - A Thumbnail History of Laurelhurst
Laurelhurst Community Club
Seattle Parks & Recreation - Laurelhurst Community Center
Seattle City Clerk: Laurelhurst neighborhood
Laurelhurst Beach Club
Laurelhurst Elementary School